Susie Frances Harrison née Riley (February 24, 1859  – May 5, 1935) (a.k.a. Seranus) was a Canadian poet, novelist, music critic and music composer who lived and worked in Ottawa and Toronto.

Life
Susie Frances Riley was born in Toronto of Irish-Canadian ancestry, the daughter of John Byron Riley. She studied music with Frederic Boscovitz, at a private school for girls in Toronto, and later in Montreal. She reportedly began publishing poetry, in the Canadian Illustrated News, at 16 under the pseudonym "Medusa." After completing her education, she worked as a pianist and singer. In 1880 she married organist John W. F. Harrison, of Bristol, England, who was the organist of St. George's Church in Montreal. The couple had a son and a daughter. 

The Harrisons lived in Ottawa in 1883, when Susie Harrison composed the song "Address of Welcome to Lord Lansdowne" to celebrate the first public appearance of the new Governor General, the Marquess of Lansdowne.

In 1887, the Harrisons moved to Toronto, where John Harrison became organist and choirmaster of St. Simon the Apostle, and Susan Harrison began a literary career under the pseudonym "Seranus" (a misreading of her signature, "S. Frances"), soon publishing articles in "many of the leading journals and periodicals."

She wrote a number of songs published in the United States and England under the name Seranus, and published other songs in England under the name, Gilbert King.

She was the music critic of The Week from December 1886 to June 1887 under her pen-name of Seranus. She wrote the "Historical sketch on Canadian music" for the 1898 Canada: An Encyclopedia of the Country.

Susan Harrison was considered an authority on folk music, and often lectured on the subject. She used traditional Irish melodies in her String Quartet on Ancient Irish Airs, and French-Canadian music in her 1887 Trois Esquisses canadiennes (Three Canadian Sketches), 'Dialogue,' 'Nocturne,' and 'Chant du voyageur'. She also incorporated French-Canadian melodies in her three-act opera, Pipandor (with libretto by F.A. Dixon of Ottawa).

Her String Quartet on Ancient Irish Airs, is likely the first string quartet composed in Canada by a woman.

In 1896 and 1897, she presented a series of well-received lectures in Toronto on "The Music of French Canada.

For 20 years, Harrison was the principal of the Rosedale branch of the Toronto Conservatory of Music.  During the 1900s she contributed to and edited the Conservatory's publication Conservatory Monthly, and contributed to its successor Conservatory Quarterly Review. She wrote the article on "Canada" for the 1909 Imperial History and Encyclopedia of Music.

In addition, she wrote at least six books of poetry, and three novels.

Writing

Poetry
Harrison's musical training is reflected in her poetry: "she was adept in her handling of the rhythmic complexities of poetic forms such as the sonnet and the villanelle. Like other Canadian poets of the late nineteenth century, her prevailing themes include nature, love, and patriotism. Her landscape poetry, richly influenced by the works of Charles G.D. Roberts and Archibald Lampman, paints the Canadian wilderness as beguilingly beautiful yet at the same time mysterious and distant."

Harrison was a master of the villanelle. The villanelle was a French verse form that had been introduced to English readers by Edmund Gosse in his 1877 essay, "A Plea for Certain Exotic Forms of Verse".

Novels
Her two novels "articulate a fascination with a heavily mythologized Quebec culture that Harrison shared with many English-speaking Canadians of her time ... characterized by a gothic emphasis on horror, madness, aristocratic seigneurial manor houses, and a decadent Catholicism." "Harrison writes elegiacally of a regime whose romantic qualities are largely the creation of an Upper Canadian quest for a distinctive historical identity."

Recognition
Harrison experienced a decline in reputation in her lifetime. In 1916 anthologist John Garvin called her "one of our greater poets whose work has not yet had the recognition in Canada it merits.".
"By 1926, Garvin describes her merely as 'one of our distinctive poets'."

The Dictionary of Literary Biography wrote of Susan Frances Harrison, in 1990, that "Harrison's unpublished work has not been preserved, her published work is out of print and difficult to obtain, and her once-substantial position in the literary life of her country is now all but forgotten."

Publications

Selected songs
Song of Welcome.
Pipandor. opera
''Trois Esquisses canadiennes: 'Dialogue,' 'Nocturne,' 'Chant du voyageur'. 1887.
Quartet on Ancient Irish Airs.

Poetry
 Four Ballads and a Play. Toronto: Author, 1890.
Pine, Rose and Fleur De Lis. Toronto: Hart, 1891.
In Northern Skies and Other Poems. Toronto: Author, 1912.
Songs of Love and Labor. Toronto: Author, 1925.
Later Poems and New Villanelles. Toronto: Ryerson, 1928.
Penelope and Other Poems. Toronto: Author, 1934.

Bibliographical information on poems from Wanda Campbell, Hidden Rooms.

Prose
Crowded Out and Other Sketches. Ottawa: Evening Journal, 1886.
The Forest of Bourg-Marie, novel. Toronto: G.N. Morang, 1898.
Ringfield, novel. London: Hodder & Stoughton, 1914.

Edited
Canadian Birthday Book. Toronto: Robinson, 1887. Poetry anthology.

Articles
"Historical sketch of music in Canada," Canada: An Encyclopedia of the Country, vol 4, J.C. Hopkins ed., Toronto, 1898.
 "Canada," The Imperial History and Encyclopedia of Music, vol 3: History of Foreign Music, W.L. Hubbard ed., New York ca 1909.

Discography
Harrison's piano music has been recorded and issued on media, including:
Keillor, Elaine. By a Canadian Lady Piano Music 1841-1997 Carleton Sound
Keillor, Elaine. Piano Music by Torontonians (1984)

References

External links
 S. Frances Harrison at Canadian Poets. Biography and 9 poems (Gatineau Point, The Voyageur, Danger, Les Chantiers, Petite Ste. Rosalie, St. Jean B'ptiste, Catharine Plouffe, Benedict Brosse, In March) 
 
 
 The Canadian Birthday Book at Internet Archive
 Music composed, arranged, or with lyrics by Susie Frances Harrison at Sheet Music Collection, Library and Archives Canada

1858 births
1939 deaths
19th-century Canadian poets
19th-century classical composers
20th-century Canadian poets
20th-century classical composers
Canadian classical composers
Canadian music educators
Canadian women poets
People from Old Toronto
Women classical composers
20th-century Canadian women writers
19th-century Canadian women writers
20th-century Canadian composers
Women music educators
20th-century women composers
19th-century women composers
Canadian women composers